Mon Histoire is a French series based on the Dear America and Dear Canada series. The books are written in French and each one is in the style of a diary based on true events. While most of the characters are fictional, some of them are based on historical personages, such as Marie Antoinette. Most of the books are set in France. They are published by Gallimard Jeunesse.

Books

See also
Dear America
My Name Is America
My America
The Royal Diaries
My Australian Story
Dear Canada
My Story (UK)
My Story (New Zealand)
My Royal Story

Series of children's books
Children's historical novels
French children's novels
French historical novels
Fictional diaries